Fuerte perdido or Asalto a fuerte apache is a 1965 Spanish western film directed by José María Elorrieta and starred by Germán Cobos, Mariano Vidal and Marta May. The story was written by Fred Uratia.

Cast
 Germán Cobos as Paul Driscoll
 Mariano Vidal Molina as Joffren
 Aldo Sambrell as James
 Luis Villar as Juez de Paz
 Cris Huerta as Arthur
 Frank Braña as John
 Rafael Albaicín as Apache
 Román Ariznavarreta as Militar
 Luis Barboo
 Ángel Celdrán
 José Luis Chinchilla as citizen
 José Guardiola
 Javier Inglés
 Rufino Inglés as Juez militar
 Ana Lazaga as Bailarina
 Marta May
 Guillermo Méndez as Capitan Nixon
 Ángel Ortiz
 Hugo Pimentel as Sargento Grey
 Julio Pérez Tabernero as Union Lieutnant
 Santiago Rivero as Fiscal
 Ethel Rojo as Tabaly
 Rosario Royo as Tendera
 María Saavedra as Julie
 José Sancho
 Pastor Serrador
 John Sullivan
 Vicente Tormos
 Manuel Torremocha

References

Bibliography

External links
 

Films shot in Madrid
Films directed by José María Elorrieta
Spanish Western (genre) films
1965 Western (genre) films
1965 films
1960s Spanish films